Sagra is a village within the jurisdiction of the Diamond Harbour police station in the Diamond Harbour II CD block in the Diamond Harbour subdivision of the South 24 Parganas district in the Indian state of West Bengal.

Geography

Transport
A short stretch of local roads link Sagra to the National Highway 12.

Healthcare
Sarisha Block Primary Health Centre at Sarisha, with 15 beds, is the major government medical facility in the Diamond Harbour II CD block.

References

Villages in South 24 Parganas district